is a Japanese anime adaptation of Samurai Warriors 4-II. It takes place after the events of its previous animated TV special. Original characters appeared in this narrative to deviate from its base. Voice actors from the game reprise their roles for their respective characters.

The TV special creators also created the TV series. TYO Animations is producing, Yuka Yamada wrote the screenplay, and Aki Tsunaki did the animated character designs. Tezuka Productions is aiding the animation department. It began on January 11, 2015 on TV Tokyo. Until the show ended, Nico Nico Seiga users could post their illustrations up for end card consideration.

Character image song CDs were up for sale during its broadcast. Blu-Ray and DVD extras include a character postcard, a behind-the-scenes booklet, a Sanada brothers radio CD recording, and a Sengoku Musou Shoot serial code for each volume. The first volume includes non-credit versions of the opening and ending. Volumes 3 and up include unaired Sengoku Musou High School segments. Purchase the first volume at Sengoku Musou Gaiden Seiyuu Ougi Gaiden 2015 Haru to receive autographs from Yukimura and Mitsunari's voice actors. Funimation has licensed the anime series for streaming and home video distribution in North America.

Plot
Number of wars occurred in order to make Japan a peaceful country but no warlords successfully achieved this objective, until Hideyoshi Toyotomi reigned. He created unity across Japan. But his death led to chaos. His son, Hideyori is supposed to succeed the throne but the Tokugawa clan believes that he can't. And so, the conflict between the Toyotomi and Tokugawa clan arises, also between the two brothers in the Sanada clan, Yukimura who sided in the Toyotomi clan and Nobuyuki Sanada who joined Tokugawa. A fateful battle awaits the two.

Characters
Yukimura Sanada

Nobuyuki Sanada

Mitsunari Ishida

Kanetsugu Naoe

Kunoichi

Inahime

Ōtani Yoshitsugu

Tōdō Takatora

Sakon Shima

Katō Kiyomasa

Masanori Fukushima

Naomasa Ii

Uesugi Kagekatsu

Katakura Kojūrō

Nene

Masamune Date

Fūma Kotarō

Hōjō Ujiyasu

Kaihime

Lady Hayakawa

Hideyoshi Toyotomi

Hidetada Tokugawa

Tadakatsu Honda

Ieyasu Tokugawa

Hideyori Toyotomi

Shingen Takeda

Suzu

Keiji Maeda

Motochika Chōsokabe

Media

Anime
The opening theme song Ikusa (戦-ikusa-) is performed by Wagakki Band while the ending theme Nadeshikozakura (なでしこ桜) is performed by Wagakki Band.

Episode list

See also
 Sengoku Basara: Samurai Kings
 Sengoku Basara: Judge End

References

Attribution

External links
 Official Sengoku Musou anime site 
 

2014 anime films
Anime television series based on video games
Funimation
Samurai in anime and manga
Samurai Warriors
Tezuka Productions
Yumeta Company
TV Tokyo original programming